John Joseph McNamara Jr. (February 7, 1932 – October 18, 1986), also known as Don McNamara, was an American banker, athlete, and author who won a bronze medal for sailing in the 1964 Summer Olympics.

Biography
Born February 7, 1932 in Boston, Massachusetts. Son of John J. McNamara and Kathleen Tobin.  Graduated from Harvard University with an A.B. in 1953.

After winning national titles in sailing in 1951 and 1955, he with two teammates, won the bronze medal in the 5.5 Meter class for Sailing in the 1964 Summer Olympics, held in Japan.  He married Ann Louise Greep later that same year.  They had three daughters.

He was a special agent in the U.S. Army Counter-Intelligence Corps from 1953 to 1957.  He later worked as an investment banker and then turned to free-lance writing in 1970.

He died October 18, 1986 in Boston, Massachusetts.  His obituary appears in the New York Times on October 24, 1986.

Works
 White Sails, Black Clouds, Burdette, 1967
 The Money Maker, Crowell, 1972
 The Billion Dollar Catch, Mead, New York, 1987

References
 Contemporary Authors Online, Gale, 2006. Reproduced in Biography Resource Center. Farmington Hills, Mich.: Thomson Gale. 2006.
 Obituary
 Sailing results for US Olympic Teams

External links
 
 
 

1932 births
1986 deaths
American male sailors (sport)
Harvard University alumni
Olympic bronze medalists for the United States in sailing
Sailors at the 1964 Summer Olympics – 5.5 Metre
20th-century American writers
Medalists at the 1964 Summer Olympics
20th-century American male writers